{{Infobox Minor League Baseball
| name             = Toledo Mud Hens
| allyears         = 1896–1914, 1916–1952, 1965–present
| city             = Toledo, Ohio
| misc             =
| logo             = Toledo Mud Hens logo.svg
| uniformlogo      = ToledoMudHensCap.png
| class level      = Triple-A (1965–present)
| past class level = 
| current league   = International League (2022–present)
| conference       =
| division         = West Division
| past league      = 
| majorleague      = Detroit Tigers (1987–present)
| pastmajorleague  = Since 1965:
| classnum         = 0
| classchamps      = 
| leaguenum        = 4
| leaguechamps     = Since 1965:| divnum           = 7
| divisionchamps   = Since 1965:| nickname         = Toledo Mud Hens
| pastnames        = 
| colors           = Navy, red, white, gold   
| mascots          = Muddy and Muddonna
| ballpark         = Fifth Third Field (2002–present)
| pastparks        = Ned Skeldon Stadium (1965–2001)
| owner            = Toledo Mud Hens Baseball Club (a non-profit corporation)
| manager          = Anthony Iapoce
| gm               = Erik Ibsen
}}

The Toledo Mud Hens' are a Minor League Baseball team of the International League and the Triple-A affiliate of the Detroit Tigers. They are located in Toledo, Ohio, and play their home games at Fifth Third Field. A Mud Hens team has played in Toledo for most seasons since 1896, including a 50-year history as a member of the now defunct American Association. The current franchise was established in 1965. They joined Triple-A East in 2021, but this was renamed the International League in 2022.

Background
Professional baseball had been played off and on in Toledo since 1883, and the Mud Hens era began in 1896 with the "Swamp Angels", who played in the Interstate League. They played in Bay View Park, which was outside the Toledo city limits and therefore not covered by the city's blue laws. The park was located near marshland inhabited by American coots, also known as "mud hens."  For this reason, the local press soon dubbed the team the "Mud Hens"—a nickname that has stuck to Toledo baseball teams for all but a few years since.  After only one season, the team moved to Armory Park.

History
1896–1914
A Mud Hens team played in the Interstate League from 1896 through 1900, then the Western Association in 1901, the American Association from 1902 through 1913, and the Southern Michigan League in 1914. The team used the Swamp Angels nickname during 1901. No team was fielded in 1915.

1916–1952
The team resumed play in the American Association in 1916 as the Iron Men, a nickname they used through 1918. The Mud Hens name returned in 1919, and the team competed in the American Association until 1952.

Mid-season in 1952, team owner Danny Menendez moved the Mud Hens to Charleston, West Virginia, where they competed as the Charleston Senators through 1960. Toledo fielded a replacement franchise in the American Association from 1953 to 1955, the Toledo Sox, which was the former Milwaukee Brewers minor-league team. That franchise subsequently moved to Wichita, Kansas, for the 1956 season, where it competed as the Wichita Braves through 1958.

1965–present
In 1965, the Richmond Virginians franchise of the International League moved to Toledo and became the current incarnation of the Mud Hens. They were based in Maumee, Ohio, at the converted Fort Miami Fairgrounds. The local ownership group led by Ned Skeldon signed with the New York Yankees to be its top farm team.

In 1967, the Detroit Tigers replaced the Yankees as its major league affiliate. That year, the team was third in the league but claimed the Governors' Cup via the four-team playoff. The next year, the team won a record 83 games and the league pennant, but failed to repeat as Cup winners. The team was affiliated with Detroit through 1973. In 1974 and 1975, the Philadelphia Phillies affiliated with the Mud Hens, followed by two years affiliated with Cleveland Indians. All four seasons were losing seasons.

The Minnesota Twins took over as the team's major league affiliate in 1978 and brought in Gene Cook as general manager, who was good at promoting the team, particularly as a family event. Cook also got Jamie Farr to incorporate the Mud Hens in Farr's M*A*S*H character's background. The Twins affiliation lasted through the 1986 season. The Mud Hens resumed their affiliation with the Tigers in 1987, and have remained in the Detroit organization since then.

In conjunction with Major League Baseball's restructuring of Minor League Baseball in 2021, the Mud Hens were organized into the Triple-A East. Toledo won the Midwestern Division title by ending the season in first place with a 69–51 record. No playoffs were held to determine a league champion; instead, the team with the best regular-season record was declared the winner. However, 10 games that had been postponed from the start of the season were reinserted into the schedule as a postseason tournament called the Triple-A Final Stretch in which all 30 Triple-A clubs competed for the highest winning percentage. Toledo finished the tournament tied for 13th place with a 5–5 record. In 2022, the Triple-A East became known as the International League, the name historically used by the regional circuit prior to the 2021 reorganization.

Season-by-season records

Records of the five most recently completed Toledo Mud Hens seasons are listed below.

Playoffs

Retired numbers

Roster

Notable players

Mud Hens players who were later inducted to the National Baseball Hall of Fame include:

Roger Bresnahan
Addie Joss
Freddie Lindstrom
Kirby Puckett
Billy Southworth
Casey Stengel
Hack Wilson

Mud Hens players who were selected as MLB All-Stars during their careers include:

Steve Avery
Nicholas Castellanos
Tony Clark
Pat Dobson
Ed Farmer
Travis Fryman
Freddy García
Curtis Granderson
Shane Greene
Marv Grissom
Carlos Guillén
Mike Henneman
Willie Hernández
John Hudek
Omar Infante
Gregg Jefferies
Thornton Lee
José Lima
Mike Marshall
J. D. Martinez
Víctor Martínez
Bobby Murcer
Joe Nathan
Phil Nevin
Jeff Newman
Joe Niekro
Dean Palmer
Lance Parrish
Carlos Peña
Dick Radatz
Mark Redman
Fernando Rodney
Kenny Rogers
Max Scherzer
Rip Sewell
Vern Stephens
Dizzy Trout
José Valverde
Justin Verlander
Frank Viola
Dixie Walker
Gary Ward
Scott Williamson
Dontrelle Willis
Dmitri Young
Al Zarilla

Mud Hens players who later managed MLB teams include:

A. J. Hinch
Gabe Kapler
Gene Lamont
Torey Lovullo
Sam Perlozzo
Casey Stengel
Ron Washington
Eric Wedge

Other Mud Hens players of specific notoriety include:
Billy Beane, three-time Sporting News Executive of the Year and subject of MoneyballMoe Berg, spy for the Office of Strategic Services during World War II
Mike Hessman, International League All-Time Home Run leader
Ralph Schwamb, convicted murderer
Jim Thorpe, two-time Olympic gold medal winner and inductee of the Pro Football Hall of Fame and College Football Hall of Fame

In popular cultureM*A*S*H character Maxwell Klinger (played by Jamie Farr) hailed from Toledo and often mentioned the Mud Hens as his favorite baseball team throughout the series. He was often seen wearing a Toledo Mud Hens cap (which bears a strong resemblance to a Texas Rangers cap). In fact, Klinger feels so strongly about the Mud Hens that he gets put on KP duty for a month when he punches his arch nemesis, Sgt. Zelmo Zale, who insulted the Mud Hens. Like Klinger, Farr was born and raised in Toledo, and the Mud Hens retired jersey No. 1 in Farr's honor.  Colonel Potter was also a fan of the Mud-Hens and was seen wearing their swag on several episodes of the series. 
 The title character of the comic strip Crankshaft was a pitcher for the Mud Hens just before World War II when he enlisted in the Army. He invariably wears a Mud Hens cap in the strip, and reminisces often about his playing days. In the summer of 2016 the Mud Hens retired jersey No. 13 in Crankshaft's honor.
 Lou Brown, the fictional manager of the Cleveland Indians in the film Major League, was said to have managed in Toledo for 30 years prior to managing the Indians.
 Richard Pryor's character, Montgomery Brewster, in the 1985 film Brewster's Millions was said to have previously pitched for the Mud Hens.
 The Melissa & Joey character Joe Longo (played by Joey Lawrence) is a Mud Hens fan and claims they win every single time he goes to the game with his foam finger. In Season 3, Episode 21 "Plus One", Mel Hart (played by Melissa Joan Hart) gets tickets right behind first base for Joe. They both end up at the game later in the episode.

See also

List of baseball parks in Toledo, Ohio

SourcesThe Toledo Baseball Guide of the Mud Hens 1883–1943'', Ralph Elliott Lin Weber, 1944.

References

External links

 Toledo Mud Hens web site

 
1896 establishments in Ohio
Baseball teams established in 1896
Cleveland Guardians minor league affiliates
Detroit Tigers minor league affiliates
Minnesota Twins minor league affiliates
New York Yankees minor league affiliates
Philadelphia Phillies minor league affiliates
American Association (1902–1997) teams
International League teams
Lucas County, Ohio
Sports teams in Toledo, Ohio
Fan-owned baseball teams
Triple-A East teams
Southern Michigan League teams